RNA binding motif protein 44 is a protein that in humans is encoded by the RBM44 gene.

References

Further reading